Julieta Granada (born 17 November 1986) is a Paraguayan professional golfer on the U.S.-based LPGA Tour and the Ladies European Tour.

Amateur career
Born in Asunción, Paraguay, Granada moved to the United States with her mother at the age of 14 in 2001 after receiving a scholarship to attend the David Leadbetter Golf Academy in Bradenton, Florida. While a student there, she earned numerous junior amateur titles. She was named to the American Junior Golf Association All-America Team from 2001 to 2004, and was the AJGA player of the year in 2004, when she won the U.S. Girls' Junior Championship. Granada graduated in 2005 from the Pendleton School, a private school established solely for students attending the Leadbetter Academy and other affiliated IMG sports academies.

Professional career
Granada turned professional in June 2005 at age 18 and competed on the Futures Tour that summer, joining in mid-season. She placed second in her first and sixth events and won her first professional title at the season-ending YWCA Futures Classic in late August in York, Pennsylvania. Granada won $29,153 in nine Futures Tour events to finish seventh on the 2005 money list, which advanced her to the final stage of the LPGA qualifying tournament in December. She finished tied for sixth in the five-round event to earn her LPGA card for 2006.

In her rookie season on the LPGA Tour, she was 19th on the 2006 money list going into the season-ending LPGA playoffs at the ADT in November. She won the final round of the elimination-format event in Florida to claim the first $1 million prize in women's golf and vaulted up to fourth on the money list. At the end of 2008, Granada attended qualifying school for the Ladies European Tour (LET) and has played on the LGPA and LET tours since.

Granada won the gold medal at the 2014 South American Games and the bronze medal at the 2015 Pan American Games. She was the flagbearer for Paraguay at the 2016 Summer Olympics, where she finished 44th. In the 2019 Pan American Games, she won the silver medals in the women's individual competition and the mixed team competition.

Amateur victories and honors
2001-2004: Member of American Junior Golf Association (AJGA) All-America Team. 
2002: Member of Canon Cup Team
2003: Member of Canon Cup Team
2004: Winner of AJGA Rolex Girls Junior Championship. AJGA Player of the Year.  Quarterfinalist in USGA Amateur Public Links Championship. Athlete of the Year in Paraguay. Winner of South American Championship individual and team titles. Six overall wins in 2004.
2005: Winner of South Atlantic Ladies Amateur Championship

Professional wins (3)

Futures Tour (1)

LPGA Tour (1) 

The total score is not shown because it did not determine the winner. Championship (fourth round) score is shown in bold.

LPGA Tour playoff record (0–2)

Other (1)
2007 (1) Women's World Cup of Golf (with  Celeste Troche)

LET playoff record (0–1)

Results in LPGA majors
Results not in chronological order before 2018.

^ The Evian Championship was added as a major in 2013

CUT = missed the half-way cut
NT = no tournament
"T" = tied

Summary

Most consecutive cuts made – 5 (2005 Kraft Nabisco – 2007 Kraft Nabisco)
Longest streak of top-10s – 2 (2014 British – 2014 LPGA)

LPGA Tour career summary

 official through 2020 season

LET career summary

Symetra Tour summary

Team appearances
Amateur
Espirito Santo Trophy (representing Paraguay): 2000, 2004

Professional
Lexus Cup (representing International team): 2006
World Cup (representing Paraguay): 2007 (winners), 2008

References

External links

Paraguayan female golfers
LPGA Tour golfers
Ladies European Tour golfers
Olympic golfers of Paraguay
Golfers at the 2016 Summer Olympics
Pan American Games silver medalists for Paraguay
Pan American Games bronze medalists for Paraguay
Pan American Games medalists in golf
Golfers at the 2015 Pan American Games
Golfers at the 2019 Pan American Games
Medalists at the 2015 Pan American Games
Medalists at the 2019 Pan American Games
South American Games gold medalists for Paraguay
South American Games medalists in golf
Competitors at the 2014 South American Games
Sportspeople from Asunción
1986 births
Living people